The 1983–84 season of the European Cup football club tournament was won for a fourth time by Liverpool in a penalty shootout in the final against Roma. The game had finished 1–1. Phil Neal had scored for Liverpool and Roberto Pruzzo for Roma. It was the seventh title in eight seasons for English clubs.

Hamburg, the defending champions, were eliminated by Dinamo București in the second round.

Bracket

First round

|}

First leg

Second leg

Liverpool won 6–0 on aggregate.

Athletic Bilbao won 4–2 on aggregate.

Olympiacos won 2–0 on aggregate.

Benfica won 6–2 on aggregate.

Rába ETO Győr won 4–1 on aggregate.

Dinamo Minsk won 3–2 on aggregate.

Dinamo București won 4–0 on aggregate.

Bohemians Prague won 5–0 on aggregate.

Rapid Wien won 4–3 on aggregate.

Standard Liège won 11–4 on aggregate.

Dundee United won 6–0 on aggregate.

4–4 on aggregate; CSKA Sofia won on away goals.

Roma won 4–2 on aggregate.

Dynamo Berlin won 6–1 on aggregate.

Partizan won 5–1 on aggregate.

Second round

|}

First leg

Second leg

Liverpool won 1–0 on aggregate.

Benfica won 3–1 on aggregate.

Dinamo Minsk won 9–4 on aggregate.

Dinamo București won 5–3 on aggregate.

2–2 on aggregate; Rapid Wien won on away goals.

Dundee United won 4–0 on aggregate.

Roma won 2–0 on aggregate.

Dynamo Berlin won 2–1 on aggregate.

Quarter-finals

|}

First leg

Second leg

Liverpool won 5–1 on aggregate.

Dinamo București won 2–1 on aggregate.

2–2 on aggregate; Dundee United won on away goals.

Roma won 4–2 on aggregate.

Semi-finals
The tie between Roma and Dundee United was controversial; it was later alleged that Roma had bribed Michel Vautrot, the referee for the second leg.

|}

First leg

Second leg

Liverpool won 3–1 on aggregate.

Roma won 3–2 on aggregate.

Final

Top scorers

See also
1984 European Super Cup
1984 Intercontinental Cup

References

External links
 1983/84 European Champions Clubs' Cup - Matches UEFA.com
 European Champions' Cup 1983-84 Rec.Sport.Soccer Statistics Foundation
 1983/84 European Champions Clubs' Cup - Scorers UEFA.com
1983-84 European Cup – results and line-ups (archive)
 European Cup 1983-84 – results, protocols, players statistics
 website eurocups-uefa.ru European Cup 1983-84 – results, protocols
 website Football Archive 1983–84 European Cup

1983–84 in European football
European Champion Clubs' Cup seasons